Gospatric or Cospatric is a Brittonic name meaning "Devotee of Saint Patrick" and may refer to:

People
 Cospatric or Gospatric, Earl of Northumbria (died after 1073), Earl of Northumbria
 Gospatricsson, the family name of the Earls of Dunbar
 Gospatric II, Earl of Lothian (died 1138), Earl of Lothian or Dunbar
 Gospatric III, Earl of Lothian (died 1166), Earl of Lothian and Dunbar
 Gospatric (sheriff of Roxburgh), sheriff in Teviotdale in early 12th century
 Cospatrick Douglas-Home, 11th Earl of Home (1799–1881), Lord Dunglass, Scottish diplomat and politician

Other uses
Cospatrick (ship), a wooden sailing ship that caught fire south of the Cape of Good Hope in 1874 with great loss of life